Anodonthyla eximia is a species of frog from Ranomafana in Eastern Madagascar endemic microhylid subfamily Cophylinae. It is the smallest species of the genus Anodonthyla and is the only known terrestrial member of the genus.

Range and distribution 
Anodonthyla eximia is only known from Maharira mountain in Ranomafana National Park, South Central East Madagascar.

Description 
Anodonthyla eximia measures just 11.3 in adult females and 9.7 mm in adult males. Anodonthyla eximia lives on the ground in the leaf litter. It superficially closely resembles other diminutive frogs from Madagascar, such as Mini and Stumpffia, but males still have a strongly developed, pointed prepollex bone that is typical of Anodonthyla.

Habitat and ecology 
Like most other miniaturised frogs from Madagascar, Anodonthyla eximia is terrestrial. According to the original description, the only known specimen was collected after cyclonic rains. Males emit high-pitched whistling calls from the leaf litter.

References 

eximia
Endemic frogs of Madagascar
Amphibians described in 2019
Taxa named by Mark D. Scherz
Taxa named by Andolalao Rakotoarison
Taxa named by Angelica Crottini
Taxa named by Frank Glaw
Taxa named by Miguel Vences